Cairns  is a city in Queensland, Australia, on the tropical north east coast of Far North Queensland. The population in June 2019 was 153,952, having grown on average 1.02% annually over the preceding five years. The city is the 5th-most-populous in Queensland, and 15th in Australia.

The city was founded in 1876 and named after Sir William Wellington Cairns, following the discovery of gold in the Hodgkinson river. Throughout the late 19th century, Cairns prospered from the settlement of Chinese immigrants who helped develop the region's agriculture. Cairns also served as a port for blackbirding ships, bringing slaves and indentured labourers to the sugar plantations of Innisfail. During World War II, the city became a staging ground for the Allied Forces in the Battle of the Coral Sea. By the late 20th century the city had become a centre of international tourism, and in the early 21st century has developed into a major metropolitan city.

Cairns is a popular tourist destination because of its tropical climate and access to tropical rainforest and the Great Barrier Reef, one of the seven natural wonders of the world.

History

Prior to British settlement, the Cairns area was inhabited by the Gimuy Walubara Yidinji people, who still claim their native title rights. Yidinji (also known as Yidinj, Yidiny, and Idindji) is an Australian Aboriginal language. Its traditional language region is within the local government areas of Cairns Region and Tablelands Region, in such localities as Cairns, Gordonvale, and the Mulgrave River, and the southern part of the Atherton Tableland including Atherton and Kairi.

From 1770 to the early 1870s the area was known to the British simply as Trinity Bay. The arrival of beche de mer fishermen from the late 1860s saw the first European presence in the area. On the site of the modern-day Cairns foreshore, there was a large native well which was used by these fishermen. A violent confrontation occurred in 1872 between local Yidinji people and Phillip Garland, a beche de mer fisherman, over the use of this well. The area from this date was subsequently called Battle Camp. In 1876, hastened by the need to export gold mined from the Hodgkinson goldfields on the tablelands to the west, closer investigation by several official expeditions established its potential for development into a port. Brinsley G. Sheridan surveyed the area and selected a place further up Trinity Inlet known to the diggers as Smith's Landing for a settlement which he renamed Thornton. However, after Native Police officers Alexander Douglas-Douglas and Robert Arthur Johnstone opened a new track from the goldfields to Battle Camp, this more coastal site became preferable. Battle Camp was renamed Cairns in late 1876 in honour of the then Governor of Queensland, William Cairns. The site was predominantly mangrove swamps and sand ridges. Labourers gradually cleared the swamps, and the sand ridges were filled with dried mud, sawdust from local sawmills, and ballast from a quarry at Edge Hill.

The Cairns Parish of the Roman Catholic Vicariate Apostolic of Cooktown (now the Roman Catholic Diocese of Cairns) was established in 1884.

Debris from the construction of a railway to Herberton on the Atherton Tableland, a project which started in 1886, was also used. The railway opened up land later used for agriculture on the lowlands (sugar cane, corn, rice, bananas, pineapples), and for fruit and dairy production on the Tableland. The success of local agriculture helped establish Cairns as a port, and the creation of a harbour board in 1906 supported its robust economic future.

The Wharf Estate Cairns went on sale in Brisbane via auction on 19 February 1889 by John Macnamara & Co. Land Auctioneers. The land was part of the place known as the Railway Reserve. The sale was described by the Auctioneers as the 'largest ever yet held in Northern Queensland'.

On 25 April 1926 (ANZAC Day), the Cairns Sailors and Soldiers War Memorial was unveiled by Alexander Frederick Draper, the mayor of the City of Cairns.

During World War II, the Allied Forces used Cairns as a staging base for operations in the Pacific, with United States Army Air Forces and Royal Australian Air Force operational bases (now the airport), as well as a major military seaplane base, Naval Base Cairns, in Trinity Inlet, and United States Navy and Royal Australian Navy bases near the current wharf. Combat missions were flown out of Cairns in support of the Battle of the Coral Sea in 1942. Edmonton and White Rock south of Cairns were major military supply areas and U.S. Paratroopers trained at Gordonvale and the Goldsborough Valley. A Special Forces training base was established at the old "Fairview" homestead on Munro's Hill, Mooroobool. This base was officially known as the Z Experimental Station, but referred to informally as "The House on the Hill".

After World War II, Cairns gradually developed into a centre for tourism. The opening of the Cairns International Airport in 1984 helped establish the city as a desirable destination for international tourism.

In the  the urban area of Cairns had a population of 144,730 people.

The population in June 2019 was 153,951.

Demographics
According to the 2016 census of population, there were 144,787 people in Cairns (Significant Urban Area).
 Aboriginal and Torres Strait Islander people made up 8.9% of the population.
 67.9% of people were born in Australia. The next most common countries of birth were England 4.0%, New Zealand 3.1%, Papua New Guinea 1.5%, Philippines 1.2% and Japan 1.1%.
 76.9% of people only spoke English at home. Other languages spoken at home included Japanese 1.6%, Mandarin 0.8%, Italian 0.7%, Korean 0.7% and German 0.6%.
 The most common responses for religion were No Religion 32.1%, Catholic 22.4%,  Anglican 13.2%, Not stated 12.2%, Uniting Church: 3.6%.

Geography

Cairns is located on the east coast of Cape York Peninsula on a coastal strip between the Coral Sea and the Great Dividing Range. The northern part of the city is located on Trinity Bay and the city centre is located on Trinity Inlet. To the south of the Trinity Inlet lies the Aboriginal community of Yarrabah. Some of the city's suburbs are located on flood plains. The Mulgrave River and Barron River flow within the greater Cairns area but not through the Cairns CBD. The city's centre foreshore is located on a mud flat.

Urban layout

Cairns is a provincial city, with a linear urban layout that runs from the south at Edmonton to the north at Ellis Beach.

The Northern Beaches consist of a number of beach communities extending north along the coast. In general, each beach suburb is at the end of a spur road extending from the Captain Cook Highway. From south to north, these are Machans Beach, Holloways Beach, Yorkeys Knob, Trinity Park, Trinity Beach, Kewarra Beach, Clifton Beach, Palm Cove, and Ellis Beach.

The suburb of Smithfield is inland against the mountains of the Great Dividing Range, between Yorkeys Knob and Trinity Park. It serves as the main hub for the Northern Beaches, with a modern shopping arcade, called Smithfield Shopping Centre.

South of Smithfield and inland from the Northern Beaches along the edge of the Barron River flood plain are the suburbs of Caravonica, Kamerunga, Freshwater, and Stratford. This area is sometimes referred to as Freshwater Valley, though it is actually the lower part of Redlynch Valley; further up the valley are the suburbs of Redlynch, on the western side of Redlynch Valley, and Brinsmead on the eastern side. Stratford, Freshwater, and Brinsmead are separated from Cairns city by Mount Whitfield (elevation ) and Whitfield Range. Crystal Cascades and Copperlode Falls Dam are also behind this range. (Kuranda, a town on the Barron River on the western side of the Macalister Range, forms part of the Cairns economic catchment but is in the Tablelands local government area and is not part of the Cairns urban area.)

The city centre of Cairns is adjacent to the suburbs of Cairns North, and Parramatta Park, Bungalow, Portsmith, and close to Westcourt, Manunda, Manoora, Edge Hill, Whitfield, Kanimbla, City View, Mooroobool, Earlville, Woree and Bayview Heights. The small suburb of Aeroglen is pressed between Mount Whitfield and the airport, on the Captain Cook Highway between Cairns North and Stratford.

Southside Cairns, situated in a narrow area between Trinity Inlet to the east and Lamb Range to the west, includes the suburbs of White Rock, Mount Sheridan, Bentley Park and Edmonton. The townships of Goldsborough, Little Mulgrave, and Aloomba are near Gordonvale, on the Mulgrave River. This area is serviced by the Bruce Highway.

Climate

 
Cairns experiences a tropical climate, specifically a tropical monsoon climate (Am) under the Köppen climate classification. A wet season with heavy monsoonal downpours runs from November to May, with a relatively dry season from June to October, though light showers occur during this period. In contrast, as little as  fell in the record dry calendar year of 2002.

Cairns has hot, humid summers and very warm winters. Monsoonal activity during the wet season occasionally causes major flooding of the Barron and Mulgrave Rivers, cutting off-road and rail access to the city. Cairns has 97.0 clear days, annually.

Tropical cyclones
Like most of North and Far North Queensland, Cairns is prone to tropical cyclones, usually forming between November and May.

Notable cyclones that have affected the Cairns region include:

 Cyclone Yasi, 2011
 Cyclone Larry, 2006
 Cyclone Abigail, 2001
 Cyclone Steve, 2000
 Cyclone Rona, 1999
 Cyclone Justin, 1997

Facilities
The City Library, operated by the Cairns Regional Council, opened in 1979 and is situated at 151 Abbott Street.  A major refurbishment was undertaken in 1999 and a further minor refurbishment was implemented in 2011.  Public accessible wifi is available.  Current Library services and collections can be accessed from the Cairns Libraries website.

Heritage listings
Cairns has a number of heritage-listed sites, including:
 Cairns-to-Kuranda railway line
 Abbott Street: Dr EA Koch Memorial
 Abbott Street: Barrier Reef Hotel
 Abbott Street: Bishop's House
 Abbott Street: St Monica's High School Administration Building
 6A-8A Abbott Street: former Cairns Customs House
 38 – 40 Abbott Street: Cairns Court House
 151 Abbott Street: Cairns City Council Chambers
 179 Abbott Street: St Joseph's Convent
 183 Abbott Street: St Monica's War Memorial Cathedral
 Collins Avenue, Edge Hill: Flecker Botanical Gardens
 Collins Avenue, Edge Hill: WWII RAN Fuel Installation
 Grafton Street: Cairns Control Room, World War II Volunteer Defence Corps
 99 Grafton Street: former Cairns Chinatown
28D Grove Street, Parramatta Park: Grove Street Pensioners' Cottages
 Lake Street: Bolands Centre
 37 Lake Street: former Adelaide Steamship Co Ltd Building
 39 – 49 Lake Street: former Central Hotel
 87 Lake Street: Hides Hotel
 93–105 Lake Street: former School of Arts
 399 Kamerunga Road, Redlynch: Xavier and Sadie Herbert's Cottage
 127–145 McLeod Street, Cairns North: McLeod Street Pioneer Cemetery
 180 McLeod, Cairns North: Herries Private Hospital
 Minnie Street: St Monica's Old Cathedral
 8 Minnie Street: Cairns Masonic Temple
 Sheridan Street, Cairns North: Cairns Technical College and High School Building
 The Esplanade: Cairns War Memorial
 51 The Esplanade: former Mulgrave Shire Council Chambers
 183–185 The Esplanade, Cairns North: Floriana
 Wharf Street: Cairns Wharf Complex
 29 Wharf Street: former Jack and Newell Building

Governance

Cairns is part of the Cairns Region local government area which is governed by a Regional Council. The Council consists of a directly elected mayor and 10 councillors, elected from 10 single-member divisions (or wards) using an optional preferential voting system. Elections are held every four years.

The Cairns Region consists of three former local government areas. The first was the original City of Cairns, consisting of the Cairns City region as listed above. The second, which was amalgamated in 1995, was the Shire of Mulgrave (comprising the other areas, namely the Northern Beaches, Redlynch Valley and Southside). The town of Gordonvale was once called Nelson. The third area is the Shire of Douglas, which amalgamated in 2008 during major statewide local government reforms.

At the time of the 1995 amalgamation, Cairns City had a population of approximately 40,000 and Mulgrave Shire had a population of approximately 60,000. Both local government authorities had chambers in the Cairns CBD. The old Cairns City Council chambers has been converted into a new city library. In a controversial decision, new Council chambers were constructed on previously contaminated land in the mainly industrial suburb of Portsmith.

Cairns has three representatives in the Queensland Parliament, from the electoral districts of Barron River, Cairns and Mulgrave. The city is represented in the Federal Parliament by representatives elected from the districts of Leichhardt and Kennedy.

Economy

Cairns serves as the major commercial centre for the Far North Queensland and Cape York Peninsula Regions. It is a base for the regional offices of various government departments.

Tourism
Tourism plays a major part in the Cairns economy. According to Tourism Australia, the Cairns region is the fourth-most-popular destination for international tourists in Australia after Sydney, Melbourne and Brisbane. While the city does not rank amongst Australia's top 10 destinations for domestic tourism, it attracts a significant number of Australian holiday makers despite its distance from major capitals. There is also a growing interest in Cairns from the Chinese leisure market with regular scheduled direct flights from Chinese cities such as Shanghai and Guangzhou. During the 2013 Chinese Lunar New Year period alone, Cairns saw 20,000 Chinese holidaymakers flying in on chartered flights.

The city is near the Great Barrier Reef, the Wet Tropics of Queensland, and the Atherton Tableland. Great Barrier Reef tours that operate from Cairns are very popular and hence Cairns is also considered as the gateway to Great Barrier Reef.

The Cairns esplanade includes a swimming lagoon with adjoining barbecue areas. In May 2003, the then Cairns Mayor Kevin Byrne declared that topless sunbathing is permitted here. Many leisure activities are conducted in this area, including flea market, sports classes and many more.

Commercial
Several shopping centres of various sizes are located throughout Cairns. The largest of these are Cairns Central shopping centre, located in the central business district (CBD), and Stockland Cairns, located in the suburb of Earlville. In Westcourt, one of the city's oldest shopping centres has been refurbished, with the city's first DFO. To service the needs of suburbs further from the city centre, shopping complexes are also located at Mount Sheridan, Redlynch, Smithfield, and Clifton Beach.

In 2010, the state government opened the second stage of William McCormack Place, an A$80 million office building credited as the first 6-star green star-rated building in the city.

Media
The Cairns Post is a daily newspaper published in the city; a weekly paper, The Cairns Sun, is also published. The Courier-Mail is a daily Queensland-wide newspaper published in Brisbane. The Australian newspaper also circulates widely. The Cairns Bulletin is an independent newspaper in circulation in the Cairns area.

Cairns is served by five television stations, three commercial television stations (WIN Television, Seven Queensland and Southern Cross 10) which are regional affiliates of the three Australian commercial television networks (10, Seven and Nine), and public broadcasters the ABC and SBS services.

All three main commercial networks produce local news coverage - Seven Queensland and WIN Television both air 30-minute local news bulletins at 6pm each weeknight, produced from newsrooms in the city but broadcast from studios in Maroochydore and Wollongong respectively. Southern Cross 10 airs a regional Queensland news updates of 10 News First.

Cairns radio stations include a number of public, commercial and community broadcasters. The ABC broadcasts ABC Far North, ABC Radio National, ABC NewsRadio, ABC Classic FM and the Triple J youth network. Commercial radio stations include Star 102.7, 4CA 846 AM, Hot FM, Sea FM and 104.3 4TAB sports radio, while the community radio stations are 4CCR-FM, 101.9 Coast FM, Orbit FM 88.0FM & 87.8FM and 4CIM 98.7FM.

Industry and agriculture 
The land around Cairns is still used for sugar cane farming, although this land is increasingly under pressure from new suburbs as the city grows. The Mulgrave Sugar Mill is located in Gordonvale.

The Barron Gorge Hydroelectric Power Station is located nearby on the lower Barron River, and provides green power.

Transport
Cairns is an important transport hub in the Far North Queensland region. Located at the base of Cape York Peninsula, it provides important transport links between the Peninsula and Gulf of Carpentaria regions, and the areas to the south of the state. Cairns International Airport is essential to the viability of the area's tourism industry.

Roads

A need for future upgrades to the Bruce Highway to motorway standards through the southern suburbs to Gordonvale has been identified in regional planning strategies to cope with increasing congestion from rapid population growth. This will result in overpasses at all major intersections from Woree to Gordonvale. The motorway will divert from Bentley Park to Gordonvale, bypassing Edmonton to reduce the effects of road noise on residential areas.

The Kennedy Highway commences at Smithfield on the Barron River flood plain north of Cairns, and ascends the Macalister Range to the township of Kuranda. The highway then extends to the town of Mareeba on the Atherton Tableland, and continues to communities of Cape York Peninsula.

The Gillies Highway commences at the township of Gordonvale, and ascends the Gillies Range (part of the Great Dividing Range) to the town of Atherton on the Atherton Tableland, passing through the township of Yungaburra on the way.

The controversial private road, Quaid Road, was constructed in 1989 through what is now a Wet Tropics World Heritage Area, and links Wangetti, on the coast just north of Cairns, to Southedge, just south of Mount Molloy. The road is not open to the public and is not used for general traffic.

Bus
A public bus transit network exists within the city, with two transit hubs located within the CBD: the Cairns Central Railway Station precinct, and the Cairns City Bus Station located within the Lake street and Shield street area, through which all bus lines operate and provide linkage to taxi, ride share and intercity rail services. The transit network includes most parts of the city, from Palm Cove in the north, Gordonvale in the south and Redlynch to the west. It is managed throughout the city by Translink: through a service contract with the Sunbus Cairns company, however the Go Card ticketing system has not been implemented in the region. A smaller shuttle bus service, Jon's Kuranda Bus runs between Cairns and Kuranda alongside other private coach services. The main bus hubs in the Cairns CBD are the Cairns City bus station, opened in 2014, and at Cairns Central, the former servicing almost all bus lines in Cairns.

Cairns is served by long-distance coaches to Brisbane, and regional cities to the south. Coaches also operate west to Mount Isa via Townsville, and to Alice Springs and Darwin in the Northern Territory.

Taxis and transportation network companies
Cairns also has a major taxi company, Cairns Taxis, which services the Cairns region. Uber was introduced to the region in March 2017, servicing the greater region. Ola launched in February 2020.

Rail

Cairns railway station is the terminus for Queensland's North Coast railway line, which follows the eastern seaboard from Brisbane. Services are operated by Queensland Rail (QR) and include the high-speed Diesel Tilt Train. Freight trains also operate along the route, with a QR Freight handling facility located at Portsmith.

Pacific National Queensland (a division of Pacific National, owned by Asciano Limited) operates a rail siding at Woree. It runs private trains on the rail network owned by the Queensland State Government and managed by QR's Network Division.

The Kuranda Scenic Railway operates from Cairns. The tourist railway ascends the Macalister Range and is not used for commuter services. It passes through the suburbs of Stratford, Freshwater (stopping at Freshwater Station) and Redlynch before reaching Kuranda.

Freight services to Forsayth were discontinued in the mid-1990s. These were mixed freight and passenger services that served the semi-remote towns west of the Great Dividing Range. There is now a weekly passenger-only service, The Savannahlander, that leaves Cairns on Wednesday mornings. The Savannahlander is run by a private company, Cairns Kuranda Steam Trains.

Cairns is served by a narrow gauge cane railway (or cane train) network that hauls harvested sugar cane to the Mulgrave Sugar Mill located in Gordonvale. The pressure of urban sprawl on land previously cultivated by cane farmers has seen this network reduced over recent years.

Airport

The domestic terminal at Cairns Airport underwent an extensive redevelopment which began in 2007 and was completed in 2010.

The airport has a domestic terminal, an international terminal, and a general aviation area. The airport handles international flights, and flights to major Australian cities, tourist destinations, and regional destinations throughout North Queensland. It is an important base for general aviation serving the Cape York Peninsula and Gulf of Carpentaria communities. The Cairns airport is also a base for the Royal Flying Doctor Service.

Port

The Cairns Seaport, located on Trinity Inlet, is operated by the Cairns Port Authority.
It serves as an important port for tourist operators providing daily reef trips. These consist of large catamarans capable of carrying over 300 passengers, as well as smaller operators that may take as few as 12 tourists. Cairns Port is also a port of call for cruise ships, such as Captain Cook Cruises, cruising the South Pacific Ocean. It also provides freight services to coastal townships on Cape York Peninsula, the Torres Strait and the Gulf of Carpentaria.

Yearly cargo through the port totals 1.13 million tonnes. Almost 90% of the trade is bulk cargoes – including petroleum, sugar, molasses, fertiliser and LP gas. A large number of fishing trawlers are also located at the port. There is also a marina that houses private yachts and boats used for tourist operations.

The Trinity Wharf has recently been the subject of a major redevelopment to improve the area for tourist and cruise ship operations. The freight wharves are located to the south of Trinity Wharf further up Trinity Inlet.

Defence facilities 
The Royal Australian Navy has a base in Cairns. The base has a complement of 900 personnel, and supports nine vessels, including:
Three Armidale-class patrol boats of Ardent Division.
Two Cape-class patrol boats.

Four ships of the Royal Australian Navy Hydrographic Service.
Two Leewin-class hydrographic ships.
Two Paluma-class survey ships.

Previously four of the six Balikpapan-class landing craft where based before their decommissioning

Porton Barracks, in the outlying suburb of Edmonton, is home to the Australian Army's 51st Battalion, Far North Queensland Regiment. Delta Company from the Townsville based 31st/42nd Battalion, Royal Queensland Regiment is also based here. Both units are components of the Australian Army Reserve.

Sister cities
  Lae, Papua New Guinea (Morobe Province) since 1984
  Minami, Japan (Tokushima Prefecture) since 1969
  Oyama, Japan (Tochigi Prefecture) since 15 June 2006
  Riga, Latvia since 1990
  Scottsdale, Arizona (USA) since 1987
  Sidney, British Columbia (Canada) since 1984
  Zhanjiang, People's Republic of China (Guangdong province) since 2005

A selection of memorabilia and artefacts relating to Cairns Sister Cities is displayed at Cairns City Library.

Education

Cairns has numerous primary and secondary schools. Separate systems of private and public schools operate in Queensland. There are 20 state primary schools and 16 state high schools operated by the Queensland state government Department of Education within the Cairns City Council area, including 6 schools in the predominantly rural areas south of Gordonvale.

Catholic schools are operated by Catholic Education Cairns. The Catholic system encompasses nineteen primary schools, six secondary colleges and one P-12 college. The oldest Marist Brothers college in Cairns is St Augustine's, which is a secondary college.  there were almost 6,700 primary students and 4,000 secondary students enrolled in the Roman Catholic school system.

There are also four other independent schools – Peace Lutheran College, Trinity Anglican School, Freshwater Christian College and Redlynch State College.

There is also Hinterland Cairns Steiner School, which is independent.

The Cairns Campus of James Cook University is located at Smithfield. CQUniversity Australia has established a study centre in Cairns. The city also hosts a TAFE college, and a School of the Air base, both located in the inner suburb of Manunda.

Health

The Cairns Hospital is situated on the Cairns Esplanade and is the major hospital for the Cape York Peninsula area. The smaller Cairns Private Hospital is located nearby. A new building was completed in 2015 to provide up to 168 more beds.

Cairns is a base for the Royal Flying Doctor Service, which operates clinics and provides emergency evacuations in remote communities throughout the region.

Sport and recreation

Soccer, Australian rules football, and rugby 

Cairns is home to Far North Queensland Heat, who play in the 2nd tier of soccer in Australia. They compete in the NPL Queensland which is one tier under the A-League. The team has represented the city nationally previously at the 2014 FFA Cup. The team competes at Barlow Park. The Cairns region has a large soccer community with a local competition which spans from Port Douglas to Innisfail and west to Dimbulah.
Notable soccer players from the region include Socceroos Frank Farina, Steve Corica, Shane Stefanutto and Michael Thwaite.

Cairns has a seven-team Australian rules football competition between teams from the Cairns and Port Douglas region.  AFL Cairns currently hosts one AFL game each season. There is also an AFL Masters team that is based in Cairns, they are known as the Cairns Stingers.

The Northern Pride Queensland Cup rugby league team played their first season in 2008, and act as a feeder team to the North Queensland Cowboys who play in the National Rugby League. Cairns is represented by 11 Senior clubs, most notably Brothers Cairns, Ivanhoes Knights, Cairns Kangaroos, Edmonton Storm and Southern Suburbs Cockatoos in the Cairns District Rugby League. Cairns also hosts growing bases for Rugby union.

Other sports 
There is a baseball league at Trinity Beach. Cairns also has a National Basketball League (NBL) team, the Cairns Taipans whose home court is the Cairns Convention Centre, known as The Snakepit during Taipans home games.

In 1965 the City of Cairns Open, a professional golf tournament, was inaugurated. Significant golfers like Randall Vines and Vic Bennetts won the event. In the mid-1970s it evolved into an amateur event. In modern times, the week-long event encompasses four tournaments, including a mixed team event and separate men's and women's tournaments.

Cairns is a major international destination for water sports and scuba diving due to its close proximity to the Great Barrier Reef. Other recreational activities popular with tourists include whitewater rafting, skydiving, hang gliding, kitesurfing and snorkelling.

Sporting facilities 

Notable sporting grounds include Barlow Park, Parramatta Park, Cazaly's Stadium, the Cairns Convention Centre, and the Cairns Hockey Centre. The Cairns Showground is used for sports as well, as the Cairns Show and funfairs.

Amenities
Established in 1978, the Cairns & District Chinese Association is an arts and heritage organisation seeking to preserve the Chinese culture and heritage of Cairns and North Queensland and enriching the contemporary cultural, social and economic diversity of the community. The society organises events such as the Chinese New Year Festival, organises Lion dancers and dragon boat racing, maintains the Lit Sung Goong Temple, and offers Chinese language classes and social group activities.

Established in 1989, the Cairns and District Family History Society maintains a library of world-wide genealogy material at 271 Gatton Street, Westcourt. The society publishes new genealogical resources based on collecting and indexing family information relating to Far North Queensland.

The Cairns Historical Society operates the Cairns Museum and Cairns Historical Society Resource Centre at the former Cairns School of Arts building on the corner of Lake and Shields Streets in Cairns City.

The Cairns branch of the Queensland Country Women's Association meets at 264 Grafton Street, Cairns North.

St Monica's Catholic Cathedral is at 183 Abbott Street. It is within the Cairns Cathedral Parish of the Roman Catholic Diocese of Cairns.

Indigenous languages and representation
The Yidiny language is a prominent language of the Cairns area.

Irukandji language (also known as Yirrgay, Yurrgay, Yirrgandji, Djabuganjdji and Yirgay) is a language of Far North Queensland, particularly the area around the Kuranda Range and Lower Barron River. The Irukandji language region includes the landscape within Cairns Regional Council.

Yumplatok  (also known as Torres Strait Creole and Broken) is a contemporary Torres Strait Island language originating in the Torres Strait. The contact with missionaries and others since the 1800s has led to the development of a pidgin language, which transitioned into a creole language and now has its own distinctive sound system, grammar, vocabulary, usage and meaning. Torres Strait Creole is spoken by most Torres Strait Islanders and is a mixture of Standard Australian English and traditional languages. It is an English-based creole; however, each island has its own version of creole. Torres Strait Creole is also spoken on the Australian mainland, including Northern Peninsula Area Region and coastal communities such as Cairns, Townsville, Mackay, Rockhampton and Brisbane.

There are four traditional owner groups representing the rights and interests of the peoples of the Cairns region. The Dawul Wuru (Yirrganydji) Aboriginal Corporation represents traditional owners in the area between Cairns and Port Douglas. Native title rights have been granted to the Djabugay people over land and waters within the Barron Gorge National Park near Kuranda. The fourth group represents the Yidinji clans, and comprises Gimuy Walubara Yidinji, Dulabed Malanbarra and Yidinji, Mandingalbay Yidinji and Wadjanbarra Tableland Yidinji.

Notable people

 Gavin Allen, Queensland and Brisbane Broncos Rugby League player
 Christine Anu, pop singer and actress
 Aron Baynes, basketball player in the NBA
 Daniel Boyd, contemporary artist
 Leonard John Brass, botanist
 Mark 'Yank' Cantoni, rugby league player
 Kev Carmody, singer-songwriter, born in Cairns
 Terence Cooper, film actor, artist
 Courtenay Dempsey, AFL footballer, Essendon Football Club
 Charlie Dixon, AFL footballer, Port Adelaide Football Club
 Catriona Gray, Miss Universe winner
 Ben Halloran, footballer for Adelaide United
 Ken Ham, creationist and religious activist
 Tracey Hannah, downhill mountain biker
 Jarrod Harbrow, AFL footballer, Gold Coast Football Club
 Xavier Herbert, writer
 Justin Hodges, international Rugby League player
 Erin Holland, an Australian singer and Television Host
 Nathan Jawai, professional basketball player, first indigenous Australian to play in NBA
 Danilo Jovanovitch, poet
 Susan Kiefel, Chief Justice, High Court of Australia
 Richard Ash Kingsford, Mayor of Brisbane, first Mayor of Cairns
 Emma Louise, musician
 Rayleen Lynch, retired Australian basketball player
 Rhyse Martin, Rugby League player, Canterbury-Bankstown Bulldogs
 Grant McLennan, musician, The Go-Betweens
 Isabel Lucas, actress
 Ryan McGoldrick, Rugby League player, Castleford Tigers
 Nate Myles, international Rugby League player
 Johnny Nicol, musician
 Danielle Oke, artist
 Wilma Reading, singer
 Adam Sarota, international football player
 Xavier Savage, Rugby League player
 Hamiso Tabuai-Fidow, Rugby League player
 Michael Thwaite, footballer for Liaoning Whowin, and occasional Socceroo
 Brenton Thwaites, actor
 Rhys Wakefield, actor
 Naomi Wenitong, member of former pop and R&B duo Shakaya.
 Shim Jake, member of the South Korean group Enhypen
 Grant Patterson, Paralympic swimmer

Gallery

See also

Notes

References

External links

 Cairns City Council Website
 University of Queensland: Queensland Places: Cairns
 Cairns Local Information Website
 Watch historical footage of Cairns and Far North Queensland  from the National Film and Sound Archive of Australia's collection.
 Cairns – Tourism Australia
 
 Freeman, Jennifer. The Collinson Index. State Library of Queensland [blog post, 2 September 2011]

1876 establishments in Australia
 
Cairns Region
Coastal cities in Australia
Fishing communities in Australia
Populated places established in 1876
Port cities in Queensland
Queensland in World War II